Tamil Nadu State Highway 142 (SH-142) is a State Highway maintained by the Highways Department of Government of Tamil Nadu. It connects Thuraiyur with Perambalur road in Tamil Nadu.

Route
The route is from ThuraiyurPerambalur road, via Kurumbalur.

See also 
 Highways of Tamil Nadu

References 

State highways in Tamil Nadu
Road transport in Tiruchirappalli